The 1985–86 FA Cup was the 105th season of the world's oldest knockout football competition, The Football Association Challenge Cup, or FA Cup.  The competition was won by Liverpool, who defeated local rivals Everton 3–1 at Wembley in the first ever Merseyside derby final. Liverpool thus became only the fifth club to win the league and FA Cup double.

First round proper

Teams from the Football League Third and Fourth Division entered in this round plus Wealdstone, Boston United, Altrincham and Telford United, were given byes. The first round of games were played over the weekend 16–17 November 1986. Replays were played on the 19th-20th.

Second round proper

The second round of games were played over 7–9 December 1985, with replays being played on the 10th.

Third round proper

Teams from the Football League First and Second Division entered in this round. Most of the third round of games in the FA Cup were played over the weekend 4–6 January 1986. Various matches and replays were played as late as 16 January, however.

Fourth round proper

The fourth round of games were played over the weekend 25–26 January 1986. Replays took place on 28–29 January, or 3–6 February.

Fifth round proper

The fifth set of games were intended to be played on 15 February 1986, but due to earlier replays, some of these matches were not concluded until just under a month later. Holders Manchester United were eliminated by West Ham United.

Sixth round proper

The sixth round of FA Cup games were played either at the weekend on 8 March or midweek on 11-12 1986. Replays were played in the following midweek fixture.

Replays

Semi-finals
Everton reached their third consecutive FA Cup final.

Final

References
 FA Cup Results Archive

 
FA Cup seasons
1985–86 domestic association football cups
FA